Al-Qabl al-Asfl is a sub-district located in al-Sha'ar District, Ibb Governorate, Yemen. Al-Qabl al-Asfl had a population of 4360 according to the 2004 census.

References 

Sub-districts in Ash Sha'ar District